The Battle of Bubiyan (also known as the Bubiyan Turkey Shoot) was a naval engagement of the Gulf War that occurred in the waters between Bubiyan Island and the Shatt al-Arab marshlands, where the bulk of the Iraqi Navy, which was attempting to flee to Iran, much like the Iraqi Air Force, was engaged and destroyed by Coalition warships and aircraft.

History
The battle was completely one-sided. Lynx helicopters of the British Royal Navy, using Sea Skua missiles, were responsible for destroying 14 vessels (3 minesweepers, 1 minelayer, 3 TNC 45 Fast Attack Craft, 2 Zhuk-class patrol boats, 2 Polnocny-class landing ships, 2 salvage vessels, 1 Type 43 minelayer, and 1 other vessel) during the battle. The battle saw 21 separate engagements over a course of 13 hours. A total of 21 of the 22 ships that attempted to escape were destroyed.  

A Canadian CF-18 Hornet fighter recorded an official victory at the beginning of the battle against the Iraqi Navy.

Also related to the Bubiyan action was the Battle of Khafji in which Saddam Hussein sent an amphibious assault to Khafji to reinforce the city against the Coalition attack. That too was spotted by the Coalition naval forces and subsequently destroyed.

The last action of the Iraqi Navy was to fire a Silkworm missile from an inland launcher at the battleship . It was intercepted mid-flight by a Sea Dart missile from the British destroyer  and successfully destroyed. That marked the first time that a ship-launched anti-air missile intercepted an incoming enemy missile in combat at sea.

After the Bubiyan action, the Iraqi Navy ceased to exist as a fighting force at all, which left Iraq with very few ships, all in poor condition.

References

Bubiyan
Bubiyan
Maritime incidents in 1991
History of the Persian Gulf
Bubiyan
Bubiyan
January 1991 events in Asia
February 1991 events in Asia